Humanitas is an interdisciplinary journal published by The Center for the Study of Statesmanship at The Catholic University of America.  It is known for its affiliation with traditionalist conservatism.

The journal seeks to foster among its readers and contributors a spirit of open inquiry, a willingness to subject cherished doctrines to challenge and look beyond conventional categories of thought. Humanitas explores issues of moral and social philosophy, epistemology, and aesthetics, and the relations among them, such as the moral and cultural conditions of knowledge. Favorable to an historical understanding of life, Humanitas explores the simultaneous tension and union between universality and particularity, and the interdependence and opposition of creativity and tradition. Fruitful new thinking will resist reductionism and will, for example, distinguish between contrasting strains within modernity and postmodernity.

Its editors are Joseph Baldacchino and Claes G. Ryn.

External links
 Humanitas official site
 National Humanities Institute official site

Multidisciplinary humanities journals